Jeffrey Lynn Green (born August 28, 1986) is an American professional basketball player for the Denver Nuggets of the National Basketball Association (NBA). He played three seasons of college basketball for the Georgetown Hoyas, before entering the 2007 NBA draft, where he was selected fifth overall by the Boston Celtics. He was subsequently traded to the Seattle SuperSonics (now known as the Oklahoma City Thunder). He spent 3½ seasons with the franchise before being traded back to the Celtics in February 2011, where he played until 2015 before being traded to the Memphis Grizzlies. In 2016, he was traded to the Los Angeles Clippers. He spent half a season with the Clippers before joining the Orlando Magic following the 2015–16 season. Green has also played for the Cleveland Cavaliers, Washington Wizards, Utah Jazz,  Houston Rockets and Brooklyn Nets.

College career

Green was born in Cheverly, Maryland, to Jeffrey Green Sr. and Felicia Akingube. He was raised in College Park, Maryland and then attended Northwestern High School in Hyattsville, Maryland, where he led the NHS Wildcats to the state basketball championship in 2004.

Green was recruited to Georgetown University by coach Craig Esherick in 2003. Esherick was fired before Green arrived on campus and John Thompson III was hired as the new coach. The two top recruits of Esherick's tenure, Green and center Roy Hibbert, were the key components of Thompson's future success. Thompson stated in a Sports Illustrated interview: "You'll stop and think when I say this, but it's true: Jeff Green is the smartest player I've ever coached. You would know this better than most: that's a hell of a statement."

Green won the 2005 Big East Rookie of the Year award along with Rudy Gay of the University of Connecticut. He was named to the All-Big East Second Team in 2006 along with teammate Roy Hibbert. In 2007, Green was named the Big East Player of the Year. He and Hibbert were unanimous selections to the All-Big East First Team. After his 30-point performance in the 2007 Big East tournament semifinal against Notre Dame and his 21-point performance in the championship against Pittsburgh, Green was named Most Outstanding Player of the tournament, as the Hoyas won their first Big East title since 1989. He led the Hoyas to the Final Four of the 2007 NCAA tournament, beating Belmont and Boston College in the first two rounds. Green beat Vanderbilt with a game-winning shot after a controversial no-call in the game's closing seconds as well as fearlessly leading the Hoyas to victory against No. 1 seed UNC in a stunning second-half comeback victory and bringing the Hoyas back to their first Final Four since Patrick Ewing led them to the 1985 National Championship game. The Hoyas eventually lost to Greg Oden and the Ohio State Buckeyes, bringing their remarkable title run to a close as well as Green's collegiate playing career, as he chose to forgo his senior year and entered the NBA draft. Green spent the next four summers taking classes at Georgetown and graduated in 2012 with a degree in English and a minor in theology.

Professional career

Seattle SuperSonics/Oklahoma City Thunder (2007–2011)
On June 28, 2007, Green was selected with the fifth overall pick in the 2007 NBA draft by the Boston Celtics. He was later traded to the Seattle SuperSonics alongside Wally Szczerbiak and Delonte West in exchange for Ray Allen and Glen Davis. On April 6, 2008, Green scored a career-high 35 points against the Denver Nuggets. Green made the NBA All-Rookie First Team in 2008 after averaging 10.5 points, 4.7 rebounds and 1.5 assists in 80 games.

The Sonics were sold and moved to Oklahoma City before the start of the 2008–09 season, becoming the Thunder. In January 2009, Green hit his first career game-winner, lifting the Thunder to a 122–121 win over the Golden State Warriors.

In 2009–10, Green played and started in all 82 games.

On December 1, 2010, Green set a new career high with 37 points against the New Jersey Nets.

Boston Celtics (2011–2015)

On February 24, 2011, Green was traded, along with Nenad Krstić and a 2012 first-round pick, to the Boston Celtics in exchange for Kendrick Perkins and Nate Robinson. Green recorded a double-double in his first start as a Celtic against the Washington Wizards on April 11, 2011, recording 20 points, a career high-tying 15 rebounds, four assists and two steals. Green improved his field goal percentage after the trade to the Celtics, shooting 48.5 percent from the floor in 26 games after shooting 43.7 percent with the Thunder.

On December 10, 2011, following the conclusion of the NBA lockout, Green re-signed with the Celtics. Eight days later, his contract was voided by the Celtics after a routine physical examination detected an aortic aneurysm. He subsequently underwent heart surgery in January 2012 and missed the entire 2011–12 season. Former teammate Kevin Durant dedicated his season to Green. Green used his downtime not only to rehab from surgery but to complete his coursework at Georgetown, graduating in May 2012 with a degree in English and a minor in theology.

On August 22, 2012, Green signed with the Celtics. On March 18, 2013, Green scored a career-high 43 points in a 105–103 loss to the Miami Heat. On April 3, 2013, he scored 34 points against the Detroit Pistons.

In 2013–14, Green played and started in all 82 games for the Celtics following the departure of Paul Pierce and Kevin Garnett in the off-season. He subsequently had a career-best season as he averaged a career-high 16.9 points per game. On January 22, he scored 39 points against the Wizards. On March 16 against the New Orleans Pelicans, he had a second 39-point game.

Over the first two months of the 2014–15 season, Green averaged a career-best 17.6 points per game.

Memphis Grizzlies (2015–2016)
On January 12, 2015, Green was traded to the Memphis Grizzlies in a three-team deal involving the Celtics and the New Orleans Pelicans. He made his debut for the Grizzlies two days later, recording 10 points and 3 rebounds off the bench in a 103–92 win over the Brooklyn Nets. On June 18, 2015, Green exercised his player option with the Grizzlies for the 2015–16 season.

On December 13, 2015, Green scored a season-high 26 points in a loss to the Miami Heat. He topped that mark on January 25, 2016, scoring 30 points off the bench in a 108–102 overtime win over the Orlando Magic. In that game, he converted an 11-footer with 1.3 seconds left for a 100–100 tie at the end of regulation.

Los Angeles Clippers (2016)
On February 18, 2016, Green was traded to the Los Angeles Clippers in exchange for Lance Stephenson and a future protected first-round pick. Two days later, he made his debut for the Clippers in a 115–112 loss to the Golden State Warriors, recording five points, two rebounds and one assist in 20 minutes off the bench. On February 26, he made his first start for the Clippers, scoring 22 points in 31 minutes of action in a 117–107 win over the Sacramento Kings.

Orlando Magic (2016–2017)
On July 7, 2016, Green signed with the Orlando Magic. He made his debut for the Magic in their season opener on October 26, 2016, scoring seven points off the bench in a 108–96 loss to the Miami Heat. On April 5, 2017, he was shut down for the rest of the season due to lower back soreness that plagued him throughout the season. Green missed the final nine games of the season with the back injury.

Cleveland Cavaliers (2017–2018)
On July 11, 2017, Green signed with the Cleveland Cavaliers. On May 27, 2018, Green scored 19 points starting in place of the injured Kevin Love, helping the Cavaliers defeat the Celtics in Game 7 of the Eastern Conference Finals. The Cavaliers reached the 2018 NBA Finals, where they were defeated in four games by the Golden State Warriors.

Washington Wizards (2018–2019)

On July 10, 2018, Green signed with his hometown team the Washington Wizards. He made his debut for the team on October 18, recording 17 points and four rebounds in a 112–113 loss to the Miami Heat. On February 4, 2019, Green scored a season-high 26 points, alongside five rebounds and five assists, in a 129–137 loss to the Atlanta Hawks.

Utah Jazz (2019)
On July 20, 2019, Green signed with the Utah Jazz. He made his debut for the team on October 23, 2019, scoring five points in a 100–95 win over the Oklahoma City Thunder. On December 24, the Jazz waived Green.

Houston Rockets (2020)
On February 18, 2020, Green was signed by the Houston Rockets to a 10-day contract. On February 28, 2020, the Houston Rockets announced that they had signed Green for the remainder of the season. The signing reunited Green with former Thunder teammates James Harden, Russell Westbrook and Thabo Sefolosha.

Brooklyn Nets (2020–2021)
On November 23, 2020, Green signed with the Brooklyn Nets, reuniting him with former Sonics and Thunder teammate Kevin Durant and once again with James Harden upon his trade to the Nets. On June 15, in the Eastern Conference Semifinal game five against the Milwaukee Bucks, Green scored a season-high 27 points to help lead the Nets to victory.

Denver Nuggets (2021–present)
On August 12, 2021, Green signed with the Denver Nuggets. He made his debut for the team on October 20, scoring 13 points in a 110–98 win over the Phoenix Suns. On January 15, 2022, Green logged a season-high 26 points, alongside three rebounds and four assists, in a 133–96 win over the Los Angeles Lakers.

NBA career statistics

Regular season

|-
| style="text-align:left;"|
| style="text-align:left;"|Seattle
| 80 || 52 || 28.2 || .427 || .276 || .744 || 4.7 || 1.5 || .6 || .6 || 10.5
|-
| style="text-align:left;"|
| style="text-align:left;"|Oklahoma City
| 78 || 77 || 36.8 || .446 || .389 || .788 || 6.6 || 2.0 || 1.0 || .4 || 16.5
|-
| style="text-align:left;"|
| style="text-align:left;"|Oklahoma City
| 82 || 82 || 37.1 || .453 || .333 || .740 || 6.0 || 1.6 || 1.3 || .9 || 15.1
|-
| style="text-align:left;"rowspan=2 |
| style="text-align:left;"|Oklahoma City
| 49 || 49 || 37.0 || .437 || .304 || .818 || 5.6 || 1.8 || .8 || .4 || 15.2
|-
| style="text-align:left;"|Boston
| 26 || 2 || 23.4 || .485 || .296 || .794 || 3.3 || .7 || .5 || .6 || 9.8
|-
| style="text-align:left;"|
| style="text-align:left;"|Boston
| 81 || 17 || 27.8 || .467 || .385 || .808 || 3.9 || 1.6 || .7 || .8 || 12.8
|-
| style="text-align:left;"|
| style="text-align:left;"|Boston
| 82 || 82 || 34.2 || .412 || .341 || .795 || 4.6 || 1.7 || .7 || .6 || 16.9
|-
| style="text-align:left;"rowspan=2 |
| style="text-align:left;"|Boston
| 33 || 33 || 33.1 || .434 || .305 || .840 || 4.3 || 1.6 || .8 || .4 || 17.6
|-
| style="text-align:left;"|Memphis
| 45 || 37 || 30.2 || .427 || .362 || .825 || 4.2 || 1.8 || .6 || .5 || 13.1
|-
| style="text-align:left;"rowspan=2 |
| style="text-align:left;"|Memphis
| 53 || 31 || 29.1 || .431 || .309 || .800 || 4.5 || 1.8 || .8 || .4 || 12.2
|-
| style="text-align:left;"|L.A. Clippers
| 27 || 10 || 26.3 || .427 || .325 || .615 || 3.4 || 1.5 || .7 || .8 || 10.9
|-
| style="text-align:left;"|
| style="text-align:left;"|Orlando
| 69 || 11 || 22.2 || .394 || .275 || .863 || 3.1 || 1.2 || .5 || .2 || 9.2
|-
| style="text-align:left;"|
| style="text-align:left;"|Cleveland
| 78|| 13 || 23.4 || .477 || .312 || .868 || 3.2 || 1.3 || .5 || .4 || 10.8
|-
| style="text-align:left;"|
| style="text-align:left;"|Washington
| 77|| 44 || 27.2 || .475 || .347 || .888 || 4.0 || 1.8 || .6 || .5 || 12.3
|-
| style="text-align:left;"rowspan=2 |
| style="text-align:left;"|Utah
| 30 || 2 || 18.4 || .385 || .327 || .778 || 2.7 || .7 || .4 || .3 || 7.8
|-
| style="text-align:left;"|Houston
| 18 || 2 || 22.6 || .564 || .354 || .857 || 2.9 || 1.7 || .8 || .5 || 12.2
|-
| style="text-align:left;"|
| style="text-align:left;"|Brooklyn
| 68 || 38 || 27.0 || .492 || .412 || .776 || 3.9 || 1.6 || .5 || .4 || 11.0
|-
| style="text-align:left;"|
| style="text-align:left;"|Denver
| 75 || 63 || 24.7 || .524 || .315 || .833 || 3.1 || 1.3 || .4 || .4 || 10.3
|- class="sortbottom"
| style="text-align:center;" colspan="2"|Career
| 1051 || 646 || 29.0 || .448 || .339 || .806 || 4.3 || 1.5 || .7 || .5 || 12.6

Playoffs

|-
| style="text-align:left;"|2010
| style="text-align:left;"|Oklahoma City
| 6 || 6 || 37.3 || .329 || .296 || .850 || 4.7 || 1.7 || .7 || .5 || 11.8
|-
| style="text-align:left;"|2011
| style="text-align:left;"|Boston
| 9 || 0 || 19.2 || .434 || .438 || .722 || 2.7 || .2 || .6 || .4 || 7.3
|-
| style="text-align:left;"|2013
| style="text-align:left;"|Boston
| 6 || 6 || 43.0 || .435 || .455 || .844 || 5.3 || 2.3 || .3 || .7 || 20.3
|-
| style="text-align:left;"|2015
| style="text-align:left;"|Memphis
| 11 || 2 || 27.0 || .333 || .222 || .846 || 4.7 || 1.7 || .5 || .5 || 8.9
|-
| style="text-align:left;"|2016
| style="text-align:left;"|L.A. Clippers
| 6 || 1 || 26.5 || .457 || .400 || .600 || 3.2 || .7 || 1.0 || .3 || 10.2
|-
| style="text-align:left;"|2018
| style="text-align:left;"|Cleveland
| 22 || 2 || 23.8 || .408 || .300 || .717 || 2.4 || 1.5 || .3 || .7 || 7.7
|-
| style="text-align:left;"|2020
| style="text-align:left;"|Houston
| 12 || 0 || 28.4 || .495 || .426 || .824 || 5.0 || 1.6 || .5 || .5 || 11.6
|-
| style="text-align:left;"|2021
| style="text-align:left;"|Brooklyn
| 6 || 1 || 24.7 || .485 || .556 || .875 || 2.8 || 1.7 || .5 || .3 || 8.2
|-
| style="text-align:left;"|2022
| style="text-align:left;"|Denver
| 5 || 5 || 22.6 || .353 || .375 || .800 || 3.6 || .4 || .6 || .4 || 3.8
|- class="sortbottom"
| style="text-align:center;" colspan="2"| Career
| 83 || 23 || 27.0 || .412 || .370 || .776 || 3.7 || 1.3 || .5 || .5 || 9.6

References

External links

 "Georgetown's Green: 'New-Age Scottie Pippen'" at washingtonpost.com

1986 births
Living people
21st-century African-American sportspeople
American sportspeople of Nigerian descent
African-American basketball players
All-American college men's basketball players
American men's basketball players
Basketball players from Maryland
Boston Celtics draft picks
Boston Celtics players
Brooklyn Nets players
Cleveland Cavaliers players
Denver Nuggets players
Georgetown Hoyas men's basketball players
Houston Rockets players
Los Angeles Clippers players
Memphis Grizzlies players
Oklahoma City Thunder players
Orlando Magic players
People from Cheverly, Maryland
Power forwards (basketball)
Seattle SuperSonics players
Small forwards
Sportspeople from the Washington metropolitan area
Utah Jazz players
Washington Wizards players
20th-century African-American people